The Motor City Cruise are an American professional basketball team in the NBA G League based in Detroit, Michigan, and are affiliated with the Detroit Pistons. The Cruise play their home games at Wayne State Fieldhouse. The franchise began play as the Long Beach Jam in 2003 under the revived American Basketball Association and moved to Bakersfield in the D-League in 2006 as the Bakersfield Jam. After ten years in Bakersfield, California, the franchise was moved to Prescott Valley, Arizona, in 2016 by the Phoenix Suns and were subsequently renamed the Northern Arizona Suns. In 2021, the team relocated to Detroit after being purchased by the Pistons.

History

Long Beach Jam (2003–2005)
During the year-long hiatus that the American Basketball Association had in the 2002–03 season, one of the teams the league approved of would be the Long Beach Jam. In the team's inaugural season, the Jam managed to procure NBA Hall of Famer Dennis Rodman, fellow veteran Corey Gaines, up-and-coming player Matt Barnes, and Japanese point guard Yuta Tabuse on their squad. They also got former NBA Finals winning head coach Paul Westhead during the start of the season, but he managed to procure himself an assistant coach gig with the Orlando Magic after their first game of the season. Nevertheless, with the presence of players like Rodman, Gaines and Tabuse under new head coach Earl Cureton, the Jam would hold a 24–7 record. It was not only considered the best record of the league that season, but also gave the Jam a bye all the way into the Finals, where they competed against the winner of the Kansas City Knights (the previous champions of the ABA) and the Juárez Gallos. In the championship round, the Jam barely escaped against the Knights to win the ABA Championship with a final score of 126–123.

In their second and final season under the Long Beach name, the Jam began their season under a pedestrian 8–6 record with another NBA Hall of Famer, this time Nate "Tiny" Archibald, leading the way as head coach during the first half of the 2004–05 season. On January 17, 2005, Archibald resigned from his position as head coach and had former player and future head coach of the Phoenix Mercury, Corey Gaines, assigned as their new head coach during the second half of their season. In that season, they managed to produce an 18–10 record in a greatly expanded ABA, with Gaines improving the team with a 10-4 second half during that season, which produced them with the second-best record in the Red Division. The Jam competed in the playoffs and made it to the quarterfinals, where they lost 130–115 to the Utah Snowbears (who produced a 25–1 that season), who would surprisingly end up forfeiting their last match to the Bellevue Blackhawks (potentially due to sunk costs with the team) since the Snowbears folded soon afterwards, while Bellevue lost the championship match to the Arkansas RimRockers. After the end of that season, the Jam withdrew from the 2005–06 ABA season to move to the NBA Development League the following season, with the intent to also move to Bakersfield soon afterwards.

Bakersfield Jam (2006–2016)
After their first season in Bakersfield ended in 2007, there was a contest where the fans could decide on a new name for the team. The choices were to rename the team Desperados, Roughnecks, Oilers, or keep the name Jam. On May 17, the team announced that the team will remain the Bakersfield Jam, as that name won the poll in a landslide vote.

The team played at Rabobank Arena until 2009 and later at the Jam Events Center.

On April 29, 2009, it was reported that the Jam had ceased operations, citing lack of sufficient fan attendance. However, on June 18, the Jam announced that they had not shut down and plan to play in the 2009–10 season, with further details to come the following day.

On April 30, 2014, it was reported that the Jam would enter a hybrid operation with the Phoenix Suns. Not only would that lead to the Suns having exclusive collaborations with the team, but it would also allow the Jam to operate under their own management in the process. On May 9, it was confirmed that the Suns and the Jam would agree to working under a hybrid affiliation. Four days later, the Jam completed their transition by allowing Suns scout Bubba Barrage to be the team's newest general manager and letting Nate Bjorkgren coach the Jam in place of Will Voigt. Since the Dignity Health Event Center seated only 500, the team did not sell individual general admission tickets and were sold to season ticket holders only.

On May 29, 2015, it was announced that Nate Bjorkgren would leave the Jam to take part in the Suns' organization as a leading player development and assistant coach. Three months later, former NBA coach Chris Jent would be the newest head coach for the Jam.

Northern Arizona Suns (2016–2021)

On April 12, 2016, the Phoenix Suns announced that the organization had officially purchased the Jam and were relocating the franchise to the town of Prescott Valley, Arizona, for the 2016–17 season and became the Northern Arizona Suns. In response, the previous owners of the Jam franchise, Stan Ellis and David Higdon, announced that they have been working with the D-League in securing a new franchise and affiliation before the 2016–17 season, although it did not come to fruition. On May 2, it was announced that former Arizona Sundogs and current Arizona Rattlers president, Chris Presson, would become the new team president for the Suns. The new team logo and jerseys for Northern Arizona was officially unveiled on May 11 and the front office personnel and coaching staff were announced on August 16. During their first season as the Northern Arizona Suns, the team started out the season strong, entering with a 10–1 record. However, the Suns would enter a major losing streak after having Tyler Ulis and Alan Williams briefly play for them via assignment, and would ultimately not recover from it afterward.

In the 2017 offseason, the D-League rebranded as the NBA G League. On October 20, 2017, the Suns had assistant general manager Louis Lehman take over general manager duties for the Northern Arizona Suns, while previous general manager Bubba Barrage remained in Phoenix as director of player personnel. Three days later, head coach Tyrone Ellis became an assistant coach for Phoenix leaving assistant coach Tyler Gatlin as the interim head coach during the G League preseason. Cody Toppert was named the head coach just prior to the start of the season. The team finished the season with a 23–27 record and missed the playoffs. At the end of the season, head coach Toppert was promoted to an assistant coaching position in Phoenix. He would be replaced by former Northern Arizona Suns assistant and Phoenix Suns' assistant coach Bret Burchard.

Following the pandemic-shorted 2019–20 season, the Phoenix Suns announced that the team would relocate to the metro Phoenix area. However, the team withdrew entirely from the 2020–21 season amidst the COVID-19 pandemic when the G League held the abbreviated season in a bubble in Orlando, Florida.

Motor City Cruise (2021–present)
On July 29, 2020, the Detroit Pistons announced that the organization had purchased the Northern Arizona Suns from the Phoenix Suns and were relocating the franchise to Detroit for the 2021–22 season to play at Wayne State Fieldhouse. It was also announced that the team's affiliation with the Grand Rapids Drive would end upon the completion of the 2020–21 season. On October 30, the team name was announced as the Motor City Cruise.

On March 17, 2021, the Cruise announced the hiring of Rob Murphy as president and general manager. Pistons' assistant coach DJ Bakker was named the first head coach for the Cruise on August 23.

Season-by-season record

Current roster

Former players

Players assigned by NBA teams
 Derrick Jones Jr. was the first player assigned to the Northern Arizona Suns through the Phoenix Suns practice squad. He would be assigned to the squad on November 3, 2016, November 25, 2016, December 23, 2016, January 4, 2017, January 9, 2017, February 22, 2017, November 7, 2017, and November 20, 2017.
 Tyler Ulis – Assigned by the Phoenix Suns on December 14, 2016.
 Alan Williams – Assigned by the Phoenix Suns on December 14, 2016, March 15, 2018, and March 20, 2018.
 Chris McCullough was the first player assigned to the Northern Arizona Suns via a different franchise besides the Phoenix Suns. He was assigned by the Washington Wizards on March 3, 2017 and on March 4, 2018.
 Davon Reed – Assigned by the Phoenix Suns on December 28, 2017, January 8, 2018, and January 21, 2018.
 De'Anthony Melton – Assigned by the Phoenix Suns on November 3, 2018, November 5, 2018, November 27, 2018, and February 20, 2019.
 Élie Okobo – Assigned by the Phoenix Suns on November 13, 2018, December 11, 2018, and March 14, 2019.
 Jalen Lecque – Assigned by the Phoenix Suns on October 28, 2019, November 28, 2019, December 26, 2019, January 21, 2020, February 6, 2020, and February 18, 2020.
 Ty Jerome – Assigned by the Phoenix Suns on November 25, 2019, November 29, 2019, and March 4, 2020.

Players recalled by NBA teams
 Derrick Jones Jr. was recalled by the affiliate Phoenix Suns on November 19, 2016, December 15, 2016, December 31, 2016, January 7, 2017, January 21, 2017, February 23, 2017, and November 19, 2017.
 Tyler Ulis – Recalled by the Phoenix Suns on December 15, 2016.
 Alan Williams – Recalled by the Phoenix Suns on December 15, 2016, March 16, 2018, and March 24, 2018.
 Chris McCullough – Recalled by the Washington Wizards after their only D-League season under the Northern Arizona Suns name ended on April 2, 2017. He was also recalled on March 14, 2018 in their first season under the NBA G League name.
 Davon Reed – Recalled by the Phoenix Suns on January 6, 2018, January 12, 2018, and January 27, 2018.
 De'Anthony Melton – Recalled by the Phoenix Suns on November 4, 2018, November 10, 2018, November 29, 2018, and February 21, 2019.
 Élie Okobo – Recalled by the Phoenix Suns on November 17, 2018, December 22, 2018, and March 15, 2019.
 Jalen Lecque – Recalled by the Phoenix Suns on November 27, 2019, December 16, 2019, January 5, 2020, February 1, 2020, and February 9, 2020.
 Ty Jerome – Recalled by the Phoenix Suns on November 27, 2019, November 30, 2019, and March 5, 2020.

Players called up by NBA teams
 Johnny O'Bryant III was the first player from the Northern Arizona Suns to be called up to an NBA team. He was first called up by the Denver Nuggets on January 26, 2017 for two 10-day contracts.
 Johnny O'Bryant III was later called up by the Charlotte Hornets on February 24, 2017 before signing a multi-year deal on March 16, 2017.
 Elijah Millsap was the first player from the Northern Arizona Suns to be called up to the Phoenix Suns. He was called up on a multi-year deal on April 9, 2017.
 Isaiah Canaan was called up by the Phoenix Suns via disabled player's exception on December 13, 2017, one day after the Northern Arizona squad originally traded for him.
 Josh Gray – Called up by the Phoenix Suns via 10-day contract on February 1, 2018, one day after Isaiah Canaan fractured his fibula in a game.
 Shaquille Harrison – Called up by the Phoenix Suns via 10-day contract on February 20, 2018, one day after Josh Gray would have his second 10-day contract expire. He was called up on a multi-year deal on March 13, 2018.
 Xavier Silas – Called up by the Boston Celtics via 10-day contract on March 28, 2018, just days after the regular NBA G League season concluded.

Players returned to the Suns
 Johnny O'Bryant III was the first player to return to the Northern Arizona Suns after an NBA stint was concluded. He briefly returned to Northern Arizona on February 16, 2017.
 Derrick Jones Jr. would be the first former Phoenix Suns player to get cut from the parent squad, only to return to the Northern Arizona squad on December 13, 2017.
 Josh Gray – Returned to Northern Arizona on February 21, 2018.

Two-way players
 Mike James became the first Suns player to hold a two-way affiliate contract to play in both the NBA and G League. James would sign his two-way contract with Phoenix on July 3, 2017, although he'd never officially get to play in Northern Arizona due to his contract concluding early on December 7, 2017.
 Alec Peters was the first Phoenix Suns draft pick to sign a two-way contract between Phoenix and Northern Arizona. Peters would sign his two-way contract on September 18, 2017 and went to Northern Arizona on October 23, 2017, thus being the first official player to play for both Suns franchises.
 Michael Young would be the first two-way player that's not a part of the Phoenix Suns' parent roster to play for the Northern Arizona Suns. Young would sign a two-way contract with the Washington Wizards on July 5, 2017 before being assigned to the Northern Arizona squad on November 13, 2017. Young would be waived from the Wizards on January 3, 2018 without playing a single game for Washington at all. This would be the only season the Wizards would assign a player to whatever G League team they wanted to, as they prepared themselves for their new G League affiliate squad, the Capital City Go-Go, a season later.
 Danuel House – Signed a two-way contract with the Phoenix Suns on December 8, 2017, one day after Mike James' two-way contract concluded. He'd join Northern Arizona on December 28, 2017.
 George King – Signed a two-way contract with the Phoenix Suns on July 6, 2018.
 Jawun Evans – Signed a two-way contract with the Phoenix Suns on December 7, 2018, after being claimed off waivers by Northern Arizona a month earlier.
 Jared Harper – Signed a two-way contract with the Phoenix Suns on August 10, 2019.
 Tariq Owens – Signed a two-way contract with the Phoenix Suns on January 15, 2020.

Players called up to two-way contracts
 Derrick Jones Jr. signed a two-way contract with the Miami Heat on December 31, 2017, and the first Northern Arizona Suns player to sign a two-way contract with an NBA team.
 Jawun Evans signed a two-way contract with the Phoenix Suns on December 7, 2018, after originally being claimed off waivers by Northern Arizona on November 4.
 Tariq Owens signed a two-way contract with the Phoenix Suns on January 15, 2020.

Head coaches

NBA affiliates

Bakersfield Jam
 Atlanta Hawks (2012–2014)
 Golden State Warriors (2006–2010)
 Los Angeles Clippers (2009–2014)
 Los Angeles Lakers (2010–2011)
 Orlando Magic (2008–2009)
 Phoenix Suns (2011–2016)
 Sacramento Kings (2006–2008)
 Toronto Raptors (2011–2014)
 Utah Jazz (2013–2014)

Northern Arizona Suns
 Phoenix Suns (2016–2021)

Motor City Cruise
 Detroit Pistons (2021–present)

References

External links
 Official website

 
Basketball teams established in 2021
Basketball teams in Detroit